The Danish Defence Staff is a senior command authority within the Danish Defence, responsible for leadership, administration, and staff support.

Role

The Defense Staff is part of the Defense Command and supports the Chief of Defence with operational management and administration of the defense. There are four department within the Defense Staff:

 The High-Command Staff Secretariat
 The Joint Operations Staff
 The Plans and Capability Staff
 The Finance Division

Chief of the Defense Staff
The Chief of the Defense Staff reports directly to the Chief of Defense and serves as his deputy. The person in question is also responsible for ensuring that the Armed Forces 'resources are utilized optimally, so that the Armed Forces' tasks are solved in the best possible way. The Chief of the Defense Staff, together with the Chief of Defense, constitutes the top management of the Defense.

List

References

External links
 
  (in Danish)

Military of Denmark
Military of Greenland
Military of the Faroe Islands
1950 establishments in Denmark